Marco Antonio Sandy Sansusty (born 29 August 1971) is a Bolivian football manager and former player who played as a defender. He is the current assistant manager of Jorge Wilstermann.

Playing career

Club
On club level he spent the majority of his career with Bolívar, apart from four spells abroad with Club Atlético Tembetary of Paraguay (where he debuted professionally), Real Valladolid of Spain, Gimnasia de Jujuy of Argentina and Tampico Madero of Mexico.

International
He played 93 international matches for Bolivia between 1993 and 2003. He played at the 1994 FIFA World Cup. Sandy made his international debut on January 29, 1993 in a friendly match against Honduras (3-1 win) in Cochabamba. He was the national record holder with 93 caps for nearly two years. Luis Cristaldo equalled his tally, playing his last and 93rd international match on October 9, 2005 against Brazil. Sandy played his last international match for Bolivia on November 18, 2003: a World Cup Qualifier against Venezuela in Maracaibo.

Career statistics

International goals

References

External links
 Argentine Primera statistics  
 International RSSSF 
 
 
 

1971 births
Living people
Sportspeople from Cochabamba
Bolivian footballers
Bolivia international footballers
Bolivian expatriate footballers
Bolivian Primera División players
La Liga players
Real Valladolid players
Bolivian expatriate sportspeople in Spain
Bolivian expatriate sportspeople in Argentina
Bolivian expatriate sportspeople in Mexico
Tampico Madero F.C. footballers
Club Bolívar players
Gimnasia y Esgrima de Jujuy footballers
Expatriate footballers in Argentina
Association football defenders
1993 Copa América players
1995 Copa América players
1994 FIFA World Cup players
1997 Copa América players
1999 Copa América players
2001 Copa América players
Bolivian football managers
Club Bolívar managers
Universitario de Sucre managers
Club Real Potosí managers
C.D. Jorge Wilstermann managers
Women's national association football team managers
Bolivia women's national football team managers